Margerit Robert (25 January 1910 in Brive-la-Gaillarde – 27 June 1988 in Isle, Haute-Vienne) was a French journalist and writer.

Biography 
He completed high school in Limoges; he was a journalist in Limoges in 1931.

From 1948, he was editor of the Le Populaire du Centre (People's Center), where he remained a columnist after 1952.
His writer's library is preserved as the "Robert Margerit" cultural Centre.

Works

Novels
Nue et Nu (1936)
L'Île des perroquets 1942; Phébus, 1984
Mont-Dragon, 1944, Gallimard, 1952
Phénix, La Table ronde, 1946
Le Vin des vendangeurs, Gallimard, 1946
Par un été torride, Gallimard, 1950
Le Dieu nu, Phébus, 1951, Prix Renaudot
La Femme forte, Gallimard, 1953
Le Château des Bois-Noirs (1954)
La Malaquaise, Gallimard, 1956
Les Amants (1957)
La Terre aux loups, Gallimard, 1958
La Révolution, 3 volumes: L'Amour et le Temps, Les Autels de la Peur, Un Vent d’acier, Gallimard, 1963, Grand Prix du roman de l'Académie française
La Révolution, 4th volume: Les Hommes perdus, Gallimard, 1968; Phébus, 1989, *El Tesoro de Morgan, Translator Manuel Pereira, Edhasa, 1997, 
El reinado del terror, Planeta DeAgostini, 2008, 
¡A las armas ciudadanos!, Planeta DeAgostini, 2008,

Others
Ambigu, nouvelles, Gallimard, 1956
Singulier, pluriel, journal intime, publié en 2008, l'Association des amis de de Robert Margerit, Plaisir de lire

Screenplays
Mont-Dragon by Jean Valère, with Jacques Brel, 1970
Les Bois noirs by Jacques Deray, with Béatrice Dalle, 1989

References

External links
Association Des Amis de Robert Margerit 
"Robert Margerit", French wikipedia

1910 births
1988 deaths
Prix Renaudot winners
People from Brive-la-Gaillarde
20th-century French novelists
French male novelists
20th-century French male writers
French male non-fiction writers
20th-century French journalists
Grand Prix du roman de l'Académie française winners